Folinic acid, also known as leucovorin, is a medication used to decrease the toxic effects of methotrexate and pyrimethamine. It is also used in combination with 5-fluorouracil to treat colorectal cancer and pancreatic cancer, may be used to treat folate deficiency that results in anemia, and methanol poisoning. It is taken by mouth, injection into a muscle, or injection into a vein.

Side effects may include trouble sleeping, allergic reactions, or fever. Use in pregnancy or breastfeeding is generally regarded as safe. When used for anemia it is recommended that pernicious anemia as a cause be ruled out first. Folinic acid is a form of folic acid that does not require activation by dihydrofolate reductase to be useful to the body.

Folinic acid was first made in 1945. It is on the World Health Organization's List of Essential Medicines.

Medical use 

Folinic acid is given following methotrexate as part of a total chemotherapeutic plan, where it may protect against bone marrow suppression or gastrointestinal mucosa inflammation. No apparent effect is seen on pre-existing methotrexate-induced nephrotoxicity. Folinic acid can be taken as a pill (orally) or injected into a vein (intravenously) or muscle (intramuscularly).

While not specifically an antidote for methotrexate, folinic acid may also be useful in the treatment of acute methotrexate overdose. Different dosing protocols are used, but folinic acid should be redosed until the methotrexate level is less than 5 x 10−8 M.

Additionally, folinic acid is sometimes used to reduce the side effects of methotrexate in rheumatoid arthritis patients. This includes reductions in nausea, abdominal pain, abnormal liver blood tests, and mouth sores.

Folinic acid is also used in combination with the chemotherapy agent 5-fluorouracil in treating colon cancer. In this case, folinic acid is not used for "rescue" purposes; rather, it enhances the effect of 5-fluorouracil by inhibiting thymidylate synthase.

Folinic acid is also sometimes used to prevent toxic effects of high doses of antimicrobial dihydrofolate reductase inhibitors such as trimethoprim and pyrimethamine.  It may be prescribed in the treatment of toxoplasmosis retinitis, in combination with the folic acid antagonists pyrimethamine and sulfadiazine.

Folinic acid is also used in the treatment of cerebral folate deficiency, a syndrome in which the use of folic acid cannot normalize cerebrospinal fluid levels of 5-MTHF.

In pyridoxine-dependent epilepsy, folinic acid may be used as additional therapy if pyridoxine or pyridoxal phosphate fails to fully control the seizures.

Side effects 
Folinic acid should not be administered intrathecally. This may produce severe adverse effects or even death.

In cancer patients, rare hypersensitivity reactions to folinic acid have been described.

Drug interactions 
Fluorouracil: Folinic acid may increase the toxicity associated with fluorouracil if the two are administered together. Some adverse effects that have occurred, particularly in elderly patients, include severe enterocolitis, diarrhea, and dehydration.

Sulfamethoxazole-trimethoprim: A potential drug interaction exists with concomitant use of sulfamethoxazole-trimethoprim and folinic acid. Folinic acid has been shown to decrease the efficacy of sulfamethoxazole-trimethoprim in the treatment of Pneumocystis jirovecii (formerly known as Pneumocystis carinii), a common cause of pneumonia in AIDS patients.

Mechanism of action 
Folinic acid is a 5-formyl derivative of tetrahydrofolic acid. It is readily converted to other reduced folic acid derivatives (e.g., 5,10-methylenetetrahydrofolate, 5-methyltetrahydrofolate), thus has vitamin activity equivalent to that of folic acid. Since it does not require the action of dihydrofolate reductase for its conversion, its function as a vitamin is unaffected by inhibition of this enzyme by drugs such as methotrexate. This is the classical view of folinic acid rescue therapy.  In 1980s, however, folinic acid was found to reactivate the dihydrofolate reductase itself even when methotrexate exists.

Although the mechanism is not very clear, the polyglutamylation of methotrexate and dihydrofolate in malignant cells is considered to play an important role in the selective reactivation of dihydrofolate reductase by folinic acid in normal cells.

Folinic acid, therefore, allows for some purine/pyrimidine synthesis to occur in the presence of dihydrofolate reductase inhibition, so some normal DNA replication processes can proceed.

Folinic acid has dextro- and levorotary isomers. Both levoleucovorin (the levorotary isomer) and racemic folinic acid (a mixture of both isomers) have similar efficacy and tolerability. Levoleucovorin was approved by the FDA in 2008.

History 
Folinic acid was discovered as a needed growth factor for the bacterium Leuconostoc citrovorum in 1948, by Sauberlich and Baumann. This resulted in it being called "citrovorum factor," meaning citrovorum growth factor. It had an unknown structure, but was found to be a derivative of folate that had to be metabolized in the liver before it could support growth of L. citrovorum. The synthesis of citrovorum factor by liver cells in culture was eventually accomplished from pteroylglutamic acid in the presence of suitable concentrations of ascorbic acid. The simultaneous addition of sodium formate to such systems resulted in increased citrovorum factor activity in the cell-free supernatants (producing, as now known, the 5-formyl derivative), and from this method of preparation of large amounts of the factor, its structure as levo-folinic acid (5-formyl tetrahydrofolic acid) was eventually deduced.

Names
Folinic acid should be distinguished from folic acid (vitamin B9). However, folinic acid is a vitamer for folic acid and has the full vitamin activity of this vitamin. Levofolinic acid and its salts are the 2S-form of the molecule. They are the only forms of the molecule that are known to be biologically active.

It is generally administered as the calcium or sodium salt (calcium folinate (INN), sodium folinate, leucovorin calcium, leucovorin sodium).

References

External links 
 
 

Chemotherapeutic adjuvants
Folates
World Health Organization essential medicines
Wikipedia medicine articles ready to translate